Donté K. Hayes  (b. 1975 Baltimore, Maryland) is an American artist known for his ceramic sculpture. He studied at Kennesaw State University and the University of Iowa. In 2019 Hayes was named  Ceramics Monthly magazine's emerging artist. The same year he won the Society 1858 prize for contemporary Southern art from the Gibbes Museum of Art.  His work is in the collection of Museum of Fine Arts, Houston. His piece, Initiate, was acquired by the Smithsonian American Art Museum as part of the Renwick Gallery's 50th Anniversary Campaign.

References

External links
 Welcoming: A Conversation with Donté K. Hayes 2021 interview in Sculpture magazine

1975 births
Living people
Artists from Baltimore
American potters
American male artists